Vladimir Vladimirovich Sedov (born 2 March 1988 in Ushtobe, Almaty Region) is a Kazakhstani weightlifter.

Career
He won a gold medal for the 94 kg class at the 2009 World Weightlifting Championships in Goyang, South Korea, with a total of 402 kg, defeating Azerbaijan's Nizami Pashayev by fifteen kilograms.

Sedov represented Kazakhstan at the 2008 Summer Olympics in Beijing, where he competed for the men's light heavyweight class (85 kg). During the competition, he successfully lifted 180 kg in the single-motion snatch, and hoisted 200 kg in the two-part, shoulder-to-overhead clean and jerk, for a total of 380 kg. Sedov, however, narrowly lost the Olympic medal to Armenia's Tigran Vardan Martirosyan by three kilograms short of his record from the clean and jerk, finishing the entire event in fourth place. On 17 November 2016 the IOC disqualified him from the 2008 Olympic Games and struck his results from the record for failing a drugs test in a re-analysis of his doping sample from 2008.

In his last major international competition, Sedov snatched 175 kg and Clean and Jerked 211 kg for a 386 kg total and Gold medal at the 2016 Asian Championships in Tashkent, Uzbekistan.

Doping 
Sedov served a two-year ban for doping from 2006. The sanction ended 18 May 2008.  In 2016 he was disqualified from the 2008 Olympic Games for failing a doping re-test.

References

External links
 
 
 
 
 

1988 births
Doping cases in weightlifting
Kazakhstani sportspeople in doping cases
Kazakhstani male weightlifters
Living people
Olympic weightlifters of Kazakhstan
People from Almaty Region
Weightlifters at the 2008 Summer Olympics
World Weightlifting Championships medalists